Terry Barber is an American countertenor with his own tours and recordings, many of which have been considered for Grammy nomination. He is additionally known for the creation of the non-profit organization Artists for a Cause.

Career
Barber has performed on some of the world's most prestigious stages including New York City's Metropolitan Opera, Carnegie Hall, and Avery Fisher Hall; Moscow's Svetlanov Hall and London's Queen Elizabeth Hall.

Barber, able to perform in many languages, has been asked to sing at the library of congress celebrating poet Mikhael Lermontov.

Barber has worked with many of the music industry's songwriters, composers and producers. He has recorded on albums with award-winning musicians such as Chaka Khan, Madonna and Cyndi Lauper.

Barber has worked with many conductors, including Armiliato, Leonhardt, Rousset, Parrot, Norrington, Kramer, Llewellyn, Bicket, and Tilson Thomas.

Barber has produced albums, including “Around the World in 80 Minutes”, “Christmas Presence”, “The Music of Andrew Lloyd Webber”, “Classical for Everyone”, “Songs She Loved”, and “Songs She Loved 2.0”.

Barber participates in a variety of vocal genres, including classical, opera, gospel, jazz, musical theatre, and folk music.

Barber has toured internationally completing 150 solo tours. Currently, Barber is touring the United States of America participating in various events.

Barber was a full-time member of the Grammy-winning ensemble Chanticleer and has been featured on recordings for many major recording labels including Sony Classical, Warner Teldec, EMI, Dorian, Edition Lilac, and Columbia Records and his own record label, rEvolv Music.

Barber was an active voting member for the Grammy Awards.

He received his Bachelor of Music degree from Northwestern University and holds a Master's degree in music performance from London's Trinity College of Music. After receiving his Master's, Barber accepted a position at the college to teach advanced vocal ensembles while in England touring with the Kent Opera.

In 2009 Barber founded the nonprofit organization Artists for a Cause which creates professional and educational opportunities for visual and performing artists whenever their art is being used for community improvement. Through Artists for a Cause, Barber facilitates scholarships and outreach for students participating in this program. Frequently, Barber participates in events the organization holds through performing and facilitating connections between the community and the students. Barber has reached over 10,000 students through Artists for a Cause. These students have been exposed to performance lectures, challenging their notions about what is possible with the human voice, and recognizing the importance of arts education and a classical foundation within the arts.

Discography 
Reflections, 1998
Joy: A Holiday Collection, 1999
Buddha Bar Presents Living Theater vol. 2, 2002
Crossing the Stone, 2003
Kapsberger & Zipoli: The Jesuit Operas, 2003
Buddha Bar Presents Living Theater vol. 3, 2003
Vocalise, 2004
Purcell: Dido & Aeneas, 2004
Dance Culture, 2005
Simply Christmas, 2005
Songs She Loved (Volumes I & II), 2007
This Town, 2008
Pergolesi: Stabat Mater, 2008
A Sacred Journey, 2010

References

External links
 Official site
 "Flow My Tears"

YouTube Channel
Artists for a Cause site

Living people
Year of birth missing (living people)
Place of birth missing (living people)
American opera singers
Operatic countertenors